The 22683 / 84 Yesvantpur–Lucknow Express is an Express  train belonging to Indian Railways South Western Railway zone that runs between  and  in India.

It operates as train number 22641from Yesvantpur Junction to Lucknow Charbagh and as train number 22684  in the reverse direction, serving the states of Karnataka, Andhra Pradesh, Telangana, Maharashtra, Madhya Pradesh and Uttar Pradesh.

This train will soon originate / terminate from Bareilly Junction as per latest orders by Railway board, exact new schedule of train is yet to announce.

Coaches
The 22683 / 84 Yesvantpur–Lucknow Express has one AC 2-tier, two AC 3-tier, seven sleeper class, six general unreserved & two SLR (seating with luggage rake) coaches and two high capacity parcel van coaches. It does not carry a pantry car.

As is customary with most train services in India, coach composition may be amended at the discretion of Indian Railways depending on demand.

Service

Routing

Important:
This train will soon originate / terminate from Bareilly Junction as per latest orders by Railway Board, exact new schedule of train is yet to be announced.

Traction
As the route is fully electrified, an Itarsi-based WAP-4 locomotive powers the train from end to end.

References

External links
 22683 Yesvantpur Lucknow Express at India Rail Info
 22684 Lucknow Yesvantpur Express at India Rail Info

Express trains in India
Transport in Bangalore
Rail transport in Karnataka
Rail transport in Andhra Pradesh
Rail transport in Telangana
Rail transport in Maharashtra
Rail transport in Madhya Pradesh
Passenger trains originating from Lucknow